B.J. Vorster Hospital is a Provincial government funded hospital for the Kou-Kamma Local Municipality area in Kareedouw, Eastern Cape in South Africa.

The hospital departments include Emergency department, Paediatric ward, Maternity ward, Out Patients Department, Surgical Services, Medical Services, Operating Theatre & CSSD Services, Pharmacy, Anti-Retroviral (ARV) treatment for HIV/AIDS, Post Trauma Counseling Services, Physiotherapy, X-ray Services, Occupational Services, Laboratory Services, Laundry Services, Kitchen Services and Mortuary.

References
B.J. Vorster Hospital

Hospitals in the Eastern Cape
Sarah Baartman District Municipality